Kokkola is a town and municipality of Finland.
The town is located in the Central Ostrobothnia region. Neighbour municipalities are Halsua, Kalajoki, Kannus, Kaustinen, Kronoby, Lestijärvi, Larsmo and Toholampi.

The municipality is bilingual with  being Finnish and  Swedish speakers.

Kokkola celebrated its 400th anniversary in 2020.

Etymology

Name

In the oldest Swedish sources Kokkola is mentioned as Karlabi. The word  means "old", karl (anglicanized Charles), is a Germanic males name, a name of many kings, meaning simply "man" and by means "village", so the town name is ambiguous meaning both "old village of Charles" or "old man village". The Latin name was Carolina Vetus. Gustav II Adolf, the founder of the city, possibly named the town in honor of his father King Karl IX of Sweden. The Finnish name is possibly derived from Kokkolahti, a narrow bay located at the place of the town. According to a tale the sea eagles (in Finnish merikotka or kokko) used to live there. Another theory claims that the name comes from ancient signal fires (kokko), which were used to warn people about approaphing enemy troops.

Heraldry
The coat of arms of Kokkola is based on the city seal issued in 1620 in connection with the founding of the city. The pattern is a symbol of tar burning and tar trade, which have played a significant part in the history of the city since its founding until the 19th century. The coat of arms was designed by Olof Eriksson and Into I. Suominen, and it was confirmed for use on December 17, 1956.

History 

The town of Kokkola was chartered in 1620 by King Gustav II Adolf of Sweden when Finland was a part of the Swedish Empire and is one among the oldest towns in Finland. The king also decided that a tar barrel, with three burning flames coming from both the ends and the plug, should be used as the town seal, because of the tar trade at that time, for which Kokkola was founded as a shipping port. Anders Chydenius (1729-1803) who was one of the leading politicians of Sweden-Finland, was a keen supporter of economic freedom and fought in the Swedish Parliament for free foreign trade and further social reforms. In 1765 the Swedish Parliament granted the city of Kokkola the staple rights. Kokkola also became an important shipbuilding centre in Finland. As a result of tar trade and shipbuilding industry, Kokkola was for a time one of the richest towns in Finland.

An interesting historical affair, known as the Skirmish of Halkokari, occurred at the town on 7 June 1854 during the Åland War, part of the Crimean War. Royal Marines from HMS Vulture and HMS Odin tried to come ashore to deal with public property in the town "in accordance with the usages of war". The marines were repelled by local defenders armed with hunting rifles supported by troops, artillery and possibly Russian advisors and military. One of the 9 smaller British craft (a gunboat) fell into the hands of the defenders. As such, this boat was the only Royal Navy vessel still in foreign possession in 1914. The boat is still today a museum-object and can be seen in Kokkola's English Park. The town council has refused to return the boat despite several requests by the United Kingdom, most recently by John Stuttard, the Lord Mayor of London. The British Treasury annually pays a small sum to the local church congregation for the maintenance of the graves of nine Royal Marines killed in action during the skirmish .

Interesting contemporaneous accounts of the disastrous action can be found in the British Newspaper Archive, citing Gamla Carleby.

The city had a Swedish-speaking majority until 1933.

In 1977, the surrounding municipality of Kaarlela was consolidated into Kokkola. In 2009, the municipalities of Lohtaja, Kälviä and Ullava were consolidated with Kokkola.

Geography 

Kokkola is the capital of the Central Ostrobothnia region, it is located on the coast of Gulf of Bothnia, the northernmost part of the Baltic Sea. Neighbouring cities and municipals are Kalajoki in the northern east, Kannus and Toholampi in the east, Halsua and Kaustinen in the southern east, Kronoby in the south and Larsmo in the southern west.

The landscape of the region around Kokkola is flat, typical for the area of Ostrobothnia, with numerous river courses flowing through the land. The biggest river in the area is Perhonjoki, which flows into Gulf of Bothnia, north of Kokkola.

The annual post-glacial rebound at Kokkola is 8.8 mm. Thus large areas of present-day Kokkola were under water when the town was founded.

Climate

Demographics 

Kokkola marks the northernmost settlement area of the Swedish-speaking population of Finland (Finland-Swedes) on the western coast of Finland. 84.0% of the inhabitants of Kokkola speak Finnish as their mother tongue, 12.6% Swedish. The remaining 3.4% speak Estonian, Russian or other mother tongues. Kokkola is an official bilingual city with Finnish as the language of the majority and Swedish as the language of the minority. The approximately 6,020 Swedish-speaking inhabitants of Kokkola are spread unevenly around Kokkola: Whereas the centre of the city is bilingual, the majority of the villages around Kokkola mostly speak Swedish. The districts which were consolidated in 2009 are, however, pure Finnish-speaking areas.

Economy 

Kokkola is the capital and biggest city in the region of Central Ostrobothnia. The chemical industry is a major employer. An industrial area and the city's port are located in Ykspihlaja. OMG has a cobalt plant. The Freeport/Umicore refinery is the only large cobalt refinery outside China. Boliden has a zinc plant. Kemira, a chemical conglomerate, built an industrial park that is now divided among several corporations. In addition, industries represented in the town include metalworking, casting, textiles, plastics, food and carpentry. Largest employers are as follows (2011):
 The city of Kokkola approx. 2.350
 Central Ostrobothnian Joint Municipal Authority for Social and Health Services (Soite) 2.500
 Boliden Kokkola Oy (zinc) 500
 Umicore (was Freeport Cobalt Oy until 2019) (cobalt) 420
 KPO group (retail) 400
 Halpa-Halli (retail) 300
 CABB Oy (fine chemicals) 200

Oil, ore and limestone are imported, refined products and timber are exported, and iron ore is transited.

The Chydenia Shopping Center, completed in 2006, is located in the center of Kokkola; about 2 million people visit at the shopping center every year.

Transport 

Kokkola is located on the coast of Gulf of Bothnia, and the coastal European route E8 (Finnish highway 8) goes through, connecting Oulu and Turku via Vaasa. Finnish highway 28 begins from Kokkola and runs to Kajaani. Finnish highway 13 begins from Kokkola and runs through Finland into the Nuijamaa border to Russia crossing via Jyväskylä and Mikkeli. The scenic '7 Bridges Archipelago Road' (road 749) runs along the coast between Kokkola and Jakobstad. The Kokkola railway station is a stop along the Seinäjoki–Oulu railway, with service between Helsinki and Kemijärvi via Tampere and Seinäjoki, where the fast Pendolino bullet train operates. There is no passenger ferry traffic from Kokkola.

Politics 
Results of the 2021 Finnish municipal elections in Kokkola:

Culture and sights 

The city is the home of the world-renowned Ostrobothnian Chamber Orchestra, which was founded by the conductor Juha Kangas in 1972.

Buildings 

The area of old wooden houses in the downtown area of Neristan has been the setting for the life and livelihood of its inhabitants for hundreds of years. Today these houses are offering restaurants, cafés, little shops and even accommodation for tourists. With its old charm it invites visitors to discover Neristan step by step.

The island houses a lighthouse which is still in use today, a museum of seal-hunting, a bird-watching tower, a lot of nature trails and even accommodations for tourists. It is easy to reach the island by ferry m/s Jenny from Kokkola.

The stone Evangelical-Lutheran Church of Kaarlela has been a landmark since 1550 and is a popular venue for weddings and concerts. Next to the church, there is a local history museum at Kirkonmäki with an Ostrobothnian farmhouse, as well as an old smithy, a tannery, a wool-carding workshop, a threshing barn, a smoke sauna, a granary barn and a loft.

K.H.Renlund Museum is devoted to Karl Herman Renlund, who donated his large art collection to the town of Kokkola. The museum houses some temporary exhibitions and the museum shop. Next to the museum is the Pedagogio, a school-house, which is Finland's oldest urban secular wooden building (built in 1696). In this quarter, there is also the Lassander House which offers a glimpse into a merchant home in the 18th century.

Sport 

Kokkola is the home of the ice hockeyclub Hermes, which plays in the second highest Finnish league (mestis). Moreover, there are the soccer clubs Kokkolan Palloveikot (KPV), which plays in the second highest Finnish league (Ykkönen) and Gamlakarleby Bollklubb (GBK), which plays in the third highest Finnish league (Kakkonen). Kokkola's volleyball team Kokkolan Tiikerit is active in the highest Finnish volleyball league and current Finnish champions for men (Lentopallon Mestaruusliiga). Sailing clubs include Gamlakarleby Segelförening, Kokkolan Purjehtijat and Kokkolan venekerho. There is also an american football team Karleby Goats, which plays in the third highest Finnish american football league (Amerikkalaisen jalkapallon II-divisioona).

Education 

Kokkola has a lot of preschools, some of them offer children a bilingual education from an early age (mostly Finnish-English or Finnish-Swedish). There are 25 Finnish-speaking and 8 Swedish-speaking schools. Moreover, there are three secondary schools for Finnish-speaking pupils and one for Swedish-speaking. Some schools offer a dual vocational education and training. The Chydenius-Institution of Kokkola, a university consortium, carries out teaching and research under the auspices of the universities of Jyväskylä, Oulu and Vaasa. It is specialized in adult education. For Finnish and foreign students it arranges open university studies, further education for professionals in the fields of education, social services and health services and management. Centria University of Applied Sciences [Finnish name: Centria ammattikorkeakoulu] is also situated in Kokkola having its other partition in Ylivieska and Jakobstad is an international institute offering three different bachelor's degree program in English language along with Finnish.

Notable people
 Anders Chydenius (1729–1803), Lutheran priest and member of the Swedish Riksdag
 Otto Donner (1835–1909), linguist, professor and politician
 Juho Kuosmanen (born 1979), film director and screenwriter

International relations

Twin towns – Sister cities
Kokkola is twinned with 15 cities:

 Härnösand, Sweden  
 Mörbylånga, Sweden  
 Ullånger, Sweden  
 Averøy, Norway
 Kristiansund, Norway
 Fredericia, Denmark  
 Ambla, Estonia
 Järva-Jaani, Estonia
 Marijampolė, Lithuania
 Boldog, Hungary
 Hatvan, Hungary
 Ratingen, Germany
 Fitchburg, United States  
 Greater Sudbury, Canada  
 Fushun, China

See also
Nykarleby
Såka

References

External links

 
 Official City of Kokkola website
 Port of Kokkola

 
Cities and towns in Finland
Populated coastal places in Finland
Grand Duchy of Finland
Populated places established in 1620
1620 establishments in Sweden